A Girl Cut in Two is a 2007 comedy thriller film directed by Claude Chabrol and starring Ludivine Sagnier, Benoît Magimel and François Berléand. It tells the story of a naïve and affectionate girl who has disastrous relationships with two rich and influential men. One uses her as a sex object and abandons her, while the second marries her but proves lethally unbalanced. The film was released in France on 8 August 2007, and received a limited theatrical release in the United States on 15 August 2008.

Plot
Gabrielle, a pretty but innocent young woman, lives with her mother in Lyon and works as a weather girl for the local TV station. She attracts the attention of two very different men. One is Paul, the heir to a pharmaceutical fortune, who is too arrogant and immature to interest her seriously. The other is Charles, a nationally known writer more than twice her age whose wife stays in their country house while he uses a flat in town. There he takes Gabrielle and teaches her the sexual arts, expanding them by visits to an exclusive sex club. Having enjoyed all her youthful passion, he disappears on an extended business trip. Gabrielle falls into a severe depression and her worried mother eventually lets Paul visit.

He takes Gabrielle for a holiday to Lisbon, in separate rooms, and there she agrees to marry him. His widowed mother is appalled and a pre-nuptial contract excludes Gabrielle from all the family wealth. Not wanting any future misunderstanding with the insecure and volatile Paul, on their honeymoon she tells him about the relationship with Charles. Back in Lyon they attend a grand gala dinner for charity hosted by Paul's mother. The principal speaker is Charles and, in front of the town's élite, Paul shoots him dead. He gets a lenient sentence of seven years in an institution, from where he divorces Gabrielle, leaving her penniless.

Back home with her mother and seriously depressed, her uncle comes up with a solution. He tours with a cheesy magic show and Gabrielle in a sexy outfit becomes the girl who is cut in two by a circular saw. A close-up reveals that her emotional pain is unrelieved.

Cast and roles
 Ludivine Sagnier - Gabrielle Aurore Deneige
 Benoît Magimel - Paul André Claude Gaudens
 François Berléand - Charles Denis, known as Charles Saint-Denis
 Mathilda May - Capucine Jamet
 Caroline Sihol - Geneviève Gaudens (credited as Caroline Silhol)
 Marie Bunel - Marie Deneige
 Valeria Cavalli - Dona Saint-Denis
 Étienne Chicot - Denis Deneige
 Edouard Baer - Edouard, the actor who is interviewed
 Jean-Marie Winling - Gérard Briançon 
 Didier Bénureau - Philippe Le Riou 
 Thomas Chabrol - Stéphane Lorbach, the lawyer
 Charley Fouquet - Eléonore Gaudens 
 Hubert Saint-Macary - Bernard Violet
 Stéphane Debac - Antoine Volte

References

External links

 
 
 
 
 Review at The New York Times

2007 films
2007 black comedy films
2007 thriller films
2000s comedy thriller films
2000s French-language films
Adultery in films
Films directed by Claude Chabrol
French black comedy films
French comedy thriller films
German black comedy films
German comedy thriller films
2000s French films
2000s German films